KJCU (89.9 FM) is a radio station broadcasting a Christian radio format. Licensed to Fort Bragg, California, United States, the station is an owned and operated affiliate of CSN International.

History
The station began broadcasting in 2004 and was owned by CSN International. It was originally licensed to Laytonville, California. In 2008, CSN International sold KJCU, along with a number of other stations, to Calvary Radio Network, Inc. These stations were sold to Calvary Chapel Costa Mesa later that year. In 2010, Calvary Chapel Costa Mesa sold KJCU, along with KJCQ and two translators, to Living Proof, Inc. for $100,000. In 2018, the station was sold to Calvary Chapel of Twin Falls, and it again became an owned and operated affiliate of CSN International.

References

External links

JCU
Radio stations established in 2004
2004 establishments in California